The Krewe of Orpheus is a New Orleans Mardi Gras super krewe and social organization.

History and Formation 
Orpheus is a musically themed krewe taking its name from Orpheus of Classical mythology. The Krewe of Orpheus was founded by Harry Connick Jr., his father Harry Connick Sr., Sonny Borey, and others. When the krewe had their first parade on February 14, 1994, there was a record high 700 riders on their parade, and they had then already established themselves as a super krewe.

Mythology 

The Krewe of Orpheus derives its name from the mortal Orpheus, son of the god Apollo and the muse Calliope. The story of Orpheus illustrates the power of music in both this world and the next. Legend is that Apollo presented Orpheus with a lyre, which he played with perfection. The music of Orpheus was so beautiful that wild animals ceased their hunting, mountains bowed, seas stopped spraying and trees bent near to listen when he sang. His music was celebrated and cherished by all who heard it. His melodies inspired the noblest love. When Orpheus sang every heart was opened.

Orpheus accompanied Jason and the Argonauts on their adventures. During one voyage a storm arose, and Orpheus began to play his lyre. Immediately, the sea calmed and the storm ended. When his fellow sailors were bewitched by the enchanted song of the Sirens, Orpheus took up his lyre and began to sing. The Sirens' song lost all its power, and the women were changed into rocks. However, Orpheus' greatest feat involved his beautiful wife, Eurydice.

Shortly after their marriage, Eurydice was pursued by Aristaeus, who was overwhelmed by her beauty. When fleeing his advances, Eurydice stepped on a snake, which bit her foot, and she died. Overcome with grief, Orpheus vowed to rescue her from the regions of the dead.

Orpheus gained entry to the Underworld by using his music to charm Charon, the ferryman and Cerberus, the three headed dog that guarded the gates of Hell. He passed through crowds of ghosts, and presented himself before Hades and Persephone. Orpheus strummed his lyre as he implored them to return Eurydice to the realm of the living. As he sang, the ghosts wept and the cheeks of the Furies became wet with tears. The yearning notes from Orpheus' lyre had kindled their memories of the sweet secrets of life's pleasures. At last, Eurydice was called forth. Orpheus was permitted to take her away, on condition that he should not turn to look at her until they both reached the surface.

They traveled through dark waters and passages, in silence. They had nearly reached the surface and shafts of sunlight began to illuminate the cavern. In a moment of longing, Orpheus cast a glance behind him. But Eurydice was still in darkness, and she was instantly carried away. They reached for one another, but only grasped the air. Eurydice was lost to Orpheus forever.

Touched by the charm and power of the music of Orpheus, Zeus turned his lyre into a constellation. Thus, Orpheus still inspires lovers, at night, as they gaze upon his stars.

Membership 
The Krewe accepts members of either gender and any race or ethnicity, and quickly became one of New Orleans' largest, after it was founded in 1993. Ridership is open to dues paid members. Krewe of Orpheus was the first super krewe to include both men and women.

Parade 
The Krewe of Orpheus parades on St. Charles Avenue and Canal Street on Lundi Gras (Fat Monday) - the day before Mardi Gras (Fat Tuesday). The parade ends inside the Convention Center where Orpheuscapade begins.

Krewe of Orpheus utilize flambeaux to light the parade route.

Parade Themes

Celebrity Monarchs

Iconic Floats 

Per 2008, the krewe has 36 floats.
Harry Connick Jr. wrote and recorded a song for his 1994 album She, called "Here Comes the Big Parade". The song's music video shows clips from floats in the parade. The floats have a large amount of flowers, gilding and gold leaf. The flowers are made out of cardboard, wire, paint, gold leafing, some of paper-mâché, etc.

Notable Floats 
In 2004, the Krewe of Orpheus bought the Dolly Trolley, the original horse-dawn bus that was used in the opening of Hello Dolly with Barbra Streisand.
The Smokey Mary (Smokey Mary) started as an 6 section float and then 2 more sections was later (2013) to be an eight unit float that looks like a [steam locomotive] and is driven by one person Barry Daigle.
The Orpheus Leviathan Float has been part of the parade since 1998. It's a three unit, ,float, and the first Carnival float to use extensive fiber optic lighting.
Trojan Horse

Throws
Trinkets, collectables, masks, and beads tossed by hand from riders of the floats are called throws. Collectible throws from Orpheus include the Orpheus emblem beads, stuffed animals, signature beads, light-up Orpheus medallion beads, custom print go-cups, three different types of doubloons, masks, and 4-foot-long stuffed dragons.

Orpheuscapade 
The Orpheus parade ends inside the Ernest N. Morial Convention Center where Orpheuscapade begins. Orpheuscapade is a post-parade black-tie party that includes live music, food, and dancing. It is open to the public by paid admission. It is estimated Orpheuscapade draws a crowd of over 5000 people each year.

Additional notes 
This krewe does not have any connection to:
the first Krewe of Orpheus: a ball krewe in Orleans Parish (1940s, 1950s)
The Original Krewe of Orpheus: a parade krewe in Mandeville, Louisiana (founded 1987)

References

External links
Official website
"Here Comes the Big Parade" - Harry Connick Jr. music video
Krewe of Orpheus, at Prof. Carl Nivale.
NOLA.com : Mardi Gras : Parades

Mardi Gras in New Orleans